The GE B36-7 is a 4-axle diesel-electric locomotive built by GE Transportation Systems between January 1980 and September 1985. 222 examples of this locomotive were built for North American railroads and eight units were built for a Colombian coal mining operation. The units were designed as successors to GE's U36B's. Of the 230 locomotives built, 180 of them were built for two Eastern railroads - Seaboard System Railroad (which became part of CSX Transportation in 1986) and Conrail.

These 4-axle locomotives were powerful when introduced in 1980. They were designed for fast and priority service, moving intermodal and container trains.

Design 
The B36-7 was developed from the B30-7, and externally is identical to its predecessor. The first 4 B36-7s were built for the Cotton Belt in January 1980, as modified B30-7s with increased horsepower and several new design features: according to Extra 2200 South magazine these units featured General Electric's new Sentry Adhesion System, a wheel slip detection system. These 3600 horsepower units also featured the new GE 752AF traction motor, the new GTA-24 traction alternator and 83:20 fine tooth gearing.

Production 

Following the 4 Cotton Belt units, GE started official B36-7 production at its Erie, PA facility. The second order for B36-7s was built for the Santa Fe in October and November 1980. Between 1983 and 1985, Conrail, Santa Fe, Southern Pacific, and Seaboard System placed further B36-7 orders. Production ended in September 1985 when the final B36-7 was built for Seaboard.

Original owners

See also
 GE U36B

References 

 
 
 

B36-7
B-B locomotives
Diesel-electric locomotives of the United States
Railway locomotives introduced in 1980
Freight locomotives
Standard gauge locomotives of the United States
Standard gauge locomotives of Colombia
Diesel-electric locomotives of Colombia